The Syracuse Orange represent Syracuse University in College Hockey America. The Orange will attempt to qualify for the NCAA tournament for the first time in school history.

Offseason

Recruiting

Exhibition

East/West showcase

Regular season

Standings

Schedule

Awards and honors
Kallie Billadeau, CHA Defensive Player of the Week (Week of October 31, 2011)
Kallie Billadeau, CHA Defensive Player of the Week (Week of January 31, 2011)
Jenesica Drinkwater, CHA Defensive Player of the Week, (Week of February 27, 2012)
Nicole Ferrara, Co-CHA Rookie of the Week (Week of December 5, 2011)
Nicole Ferrara, CHA Rookie of the Week (Week of January 31, 2011)
Allie LaCombe, CHA Rookie of the Week (Week of October 24, 2011)
Margot Scharfe, CHA Player of the Week (Week of January 31, 2011)
Margot Scharfe, CHA Player of the Week, (Week of February 27, 2012)

References

Syracuse Orange women's ice hockey seasons
Syracuse
Syracuse Orange
Syracuse Orange